Lœuilly is a former commune in the Somme department in Hauts-de-France in northern France. On 1 January 2019, it was merged into the new commune Ô-de-Selle.

Geography

The commune is subject to flooding and has measures in place to prevent it.

History
Lœuilly was inhabited during Gallo-Roman times. The first settlement was alongside the river near a drinking trough, fed by a spring, the Blaire fountain. The water, renowned for its digestive qualities, was sold to the public, before mains water was available.  
In 1472, Burgundian troops led by Charles the Bold destroyed the château. 
In 1593, the inhabitants tried in vain to stop the Catholic League coming into the village, which was partially burnt down.

Many watermills, and later, factories powered by the water, sprang up along the river, to take advantage of the natural force. A mill pond once filled the area near where the Mairie and car-park are found today.

The railway from Beauvais to Amiens ran through the town from 1876 to 1939. The old route is now a popular walk.

Places of interest
 The seventeenth century church of Saint-Martin. The clock on the bell-tower is unusually off-centre.
 Several old watermills on the banks of the river Selle

Population

See also
Communes of the Somme department

References

Former communes of Somme (department)
Populated places disestablished in 2019